Maura Connelly is an American diplomat. President Obama nominated Ambassador Connelly, a 25-year veteran of the Foreign Service, as the U.S. Ambassador to the Republic of Lebanon in June 2010.  Ambassador Connelly was confirmed by the Senate in August 2010 and sworn in by Secretary of State Hillary Clinton in September 2010. She officially presented her diplomatic credentials to Lebanese President Michel Sleiman as the 25th U.S. Ambassador to the Republic of Lebanon on September 15, 2010.

Biography
Ambassador Connelly received a B.S. in Foreign Service from Georgetown University and a Masters in National Security Studies from the U.S. Naval War College.  A native of Jersey City, New Jersey, Ambassador Connelly first went to Washington, DC to serve as a Page in the U.S. House of Representatives from 1975 to 1977.

Maura Connelly is a career member of the Senior Foreign Service and most recently served in the Bureau of Near Eastern Affairs as Deputy Assistant Secretary responsible for the Levant and Egypt.  Prior to that, Ambassador Connelly was the Chargé d'affaires of the U.S. Embassy in Damascus, Syria from 2008 to 2009.  Ambassador Connelly previously served as the Political Minister-Counselor at the U.S. Embassy in London, U.K. between 2005 and 2008.  From 2003 to 2005, Ambassador Connelly was the Deputy Principal Officer at the U.S. Consulate General in Jerusalem, where she also served from 1993 to 1996 as Political Section Chief.   She has also served as the Deputy Counselor for Political Affairs for the U.S. Mission to the United Nations in New York.  Her other overseas postings include Jordan, Algeria and South Africa.

References

External links

Year of birth missing (living people)
Living people
Ambassadors of the United States to Lebanon
Walsh School of Foreign Service alumni
Ambassadors of the United States to Syria
Naval War College alumni
Place of birth missing (living people)
People from Jersey City, New Jersey
United States Foreign Service personnel
American women ambassadors